Olivier Patience (born 25 March 1980) is a former French professional tennis player. His career high Association of Tennis Professionals (ATP) singles ranking was world no. 87, on 19 July 2004. During 2006, Patience won three ATP Challenger Series tournaments. He reached the third round at the 2004 Australian Open and 2007 French Open. In the latter, he defeated Jonathan Eysseric in the first round in four sets, and then Mariano Zabaleta, 7–5, 6–3, 3–6, 2–6, 6–4, eventually losing to Novak Djokovic in five sets, 6–7, 6–2, 6–3, 6–7, 3–6.

Singles titles

Wins (10)

Runners-up (3)

Doubles titles

Wins (1)

External links
 
 
 Patience World Ranking History

1980 births
Living people
French male tennis players
Sportspeople from Évreux